Ravindra Chandra Bhargava, abbreviated as R. C. Bhargava (born 30 July 1934), is the former C.E.O and current chairman of Maruti Suzuki, the largest automobile manufacturer in India, having joined the company after serving twenty-five years as an Indian Administrative Service officer.

Education

Bhargava was educated at The Doon School, Allahabad University and Williams College, Massachusetts. After a long career as an Indian Administrative Service officer, he joined Maruti in 1981, where he has remained ever since. In 2016, he was awarded the Padma Bhushan, the third highest civilian award in the Republic of India.

See also
 Maruti Suzuki

References

External links
Profile - Maruti Suzuki

1934 births
Living people
The Doon School alumni
University of Allahabad alumni
Williams College alumni
Indian Administrative Service officers